The Russian Orthodox Old-Rite Church (or Russian Orthodox Oldritualist Church, Russian Orthodox Old-Ritualist Church) is an Eastern Orthodox Church of the Old Believers tradition, which rejected the liturgical and canonical reforms of Patriarch Nikon in the second half of 17th century (Old Believers). It is one of the two Old Believers churches that belong to the Belokrinitskaya Hierarchy - together with the Orthodox Old-Rite Church, sometimes also called Lipovan Orthodox Old-Rite Church. 

Since the 18th century until the Council of 1988, the official self-designation of this Church was the Old Orthodox Church of Christ (Древлеправославная Церковь Христова) which should not be confused with Russian Old-Orthodox Church, another church of the Old Believers. Drevlepravoslavie ("Old/Ancient Orthodoxy") was the common self-designation of the Old Believers and their cause since the 17th century.

The head of the Church carries the title of Metropolitan of Moscow and all Russia (since 1988), with residence at the Rogozhskoye cemetery in Moscow. The current head of the Church, Metropolitan Korniliy (Titov) (formerly, the archbishop of Kazan and Vyatka) was elected by the Most Holy Council on October 18, 2005.  He was installed as Metropolitan on October 23, 2005. The only pre-Petrine monastery still held by the Old Believers is the Uleima Convent near Uglich.

History (Belokrinitskaya Hierarchy in Russia, end of 19th century–present) 

The conversion of Met. Amvrosii caused a bitter reaction of Russian Imperial authorities and he was soon pressed to leave his see, but not before he consecrated another bishop for his new Church - archbishop Kiril (Timofeev). The activity of the Belokrinitskaya Hierarchy on the territory of the Russian Empire met with numerous obstructions from Russian imperial authorities, as well as with an internal schism (see Okruzhniki, Neokruzhniki). The situation was radically changed with the publication in 1905 of the Emperor's Ukaz "On Religious Tolerance", soon followed by the "unsealing" of the altars at the important religious and cultural center of Old Believers, the Rogozhskoye cemetery.

After the coming of the Bolsheviks to power in 1917 and the Civil war, the Old-Rite Church was subjected to innumerable sufferings and persecutions, just as its former rival, the "Nikonian" Russian Orthodox Church. In 1940, the only bishop who was not imprisoned by the Soviet atheistic authorities was Bishop Sava of Kaluga who, in the same year, single-handedly elevated another bishop - Irinarch - to the see of the Archbishop of Moscow.  The period of persecution was followed by the period of relative stability, under a tight control from the Soviet secret services. However, the time of perestroika and subsequent changes in the country's political, cultural and economic life had a little effect on the position of the Old-Rite Church in the Russian society - the 17-year tenure of Metropolitan Alimpiy (Gusev) is by some considered a time of "recollection".

His follower, Metropolitan Andrian (Chetvergov) in the February 2004, showed himself as a charismatic and talented leader, concerned with formulating and propagating the cultural and religious "message" of the Old Believers for the modern Russian society. While declaring himself as traditionalist and conservative in his public statements, Andrian took a significant step forward in initiating some form of a dialogue with the Russian Orthodox Church and Russian political establishment.  Unfortunately, many such plans were cut short with the unexpected death of Metropolitan Andrian on August 10, 2005 during pilgrimage in one of the remote regions of Russia (he had a chronic heart condition). Many questioned the willingness of the church leadership to continue on the "new course" chosen by Andrian. However, the new Metropolitan Korniliy, elected on October 18, 2005, confirmed that he will continue on the policy of openness to the Russian society, started by his predecessor.

Organization 

The head of the Church is the Metropolitan of Moscow and All Russia (archbishop in 1846–1988), residing at the Rogozhskoye cemetery in Moscow. He is elected by the highest representative body of the Church - the Holy Council (Освященный Собор). The Council also appoints the members of the Council of the Metropolitanate.

The Church has five local bishops and more than 250 parishes in Russia, Ukraine, Belarus and Kazakhstan.  Since several years ago, there have been attempts to restore theological schools for training priests for the Old-Rite Church.

The Russian Orthodox Old-Rite Church belong to the Belokrinitskaya Hierarchy and was until the 16/29 May 2008 in full ecclesiastical and canonical communion with the Lipovan Orthodox Old-Rite Church.

First Hierarchs of the Belokrinitskaya Hierarchy, 1846–present 

In Hungary and Romania (Belaya Krinitza, temporarily in Brăila, Romania)

In Russia

See also
 Old Believers
 Russian Orthodox Church
 Belokrinitskoe Soglasie
 Belokrinitskaya Hierarchy

External links
 Official web site (Russian)
 Old Believers of Altai (official site of the Barnaul Parish Russian Orthodox Old-Rite Church) 
 Presentation (Russian)
 OrthodoxWiki - Russian Orthodox Oldritualist Church
 Sedmitza - Old Rite believers today (TV programme, 21.05.05)

References

Bibliography
 S. G. Vurgraft, I. A. Ushakov. Staroobriadchestvo. Litsa, predmety, sobytiia i simvoly. Opyt entsiklopedicheskogo slovaria [The Old Believers: Figures, Subjects, Events and Symbols. An Encyclopedic Dictionary] Moscow: Tserkov, 1996.

Old Believer movement
16th-century establishments in Russia
Christian organizations established in the 16th century